Sarvodaya Express is a Express train of the Indian Railways connecting Gandhidham Junction in Gujarat and Shri Mata Vaishno Devi Katra of Jammu and Kashmir. It is currently being operated with 12473/12474 train numbers on a weekly basis.

Service 

12473/Sarvodaya Express has an average speed of 57 km/hr and covers 2047 km in 36 hrs 00 mins.

12474/Sarvodaya Express has an average speed of 58 km/hr and covers 2047 km in 35 hrs 00 mins.

Route and halts

Coach composite 

The train has standard LHB rakes with max speed of 110 kmph. The train consists of 22 coaches:

 2 AC II Tier
 4 AC III Tier
 11 Sleeper Coaches
 1 Pantry Car
 2 General
 2 Seating cum Luggage Rake

Traction 

Both trains are hauled by a Sabarmati-based WDP-4D from Gandhidham Junction to till Ahmedabad Junction after which Vadodara Loco Shed or Ghaziabad based WAP-7 electric locomotive hauls the train from Ahmedabad Junction to Shri Mata Vaishno Devi Katra and vice versa.

Rake sharing 

This train shares its rake with

 12471/12472 Swaraj Express
 12475/12476 Hapa - Shri Mata Vaishno Devi Katra Sarvodaya Express
 12477/12478 Jamnagar - Shri Mata Vaishno Devi Katra Express

Notes

See also 

 Ahmedabad Junction railway station
 Shri Mata Vaishno Devi Katra railway station

References

External links 

 12473/Sarvodaya Express
 12474/Sarvodaya Express

Transport in Ahmedabad
Transport in Katra, Jammu and Kashmir
Express trains in India
Rail transport in Uttar Pradesh
Rail transport in Madhya Pradesh
Rail transport in Gujarat
Rail transport in Rajasthan
Rail transport in Delhi
Rail transport in Haryana
Rail transport in Punjab, India
Rail transport in Jammu and Kashmir